Rodovia Professor Zeferino Vaz (official designation SP-332, also known as Rodovia Campinas-Paulínia or Tapetão) is a highway in the state of São Paulo, Brazil. Until 2010, this highway was called Rodovia General Milton Tavares de Souza.

Just 23 km long, this double-lane highway has a high traffic within the urban zones of Campinas and Paulínia. It has been named in honour of teacher Zeferino Vaz and is maintained by the Department of Roads of the State of São Paulo (DER) and Rota das Bandeiras. It is best known as the road that connects the city of Campinas to the subdistrict of Barão Geraldo, where the State University of Campinas is located, as well as to the oil refinery of Petrobras and the adjoining industrial petrochemistry district of Paulínia.

The highway became the first in the State of São Paulo with public illumination along its entire length.

Cities
 Campinas
 Barão Geraldo
 Paulínia
 Betel
 Cosmópolis
 Artur Nogueira
 Engenheiro Coelho
 Conchal

See also
 Highway system of São Paulo
 Brazilian Highway System

Highways in São Paulo (state)
Transport in Campinas